Ohio Valley and Eastern Ohio Regional Transit Authority  is the provider of public transportation located in Wheeling, West Virginia and the surrounding area. The company is split into two divisions, the OVRTA, which provides seven routes on the West Virginia side of metro area, and the EORTA, which features four routes for the Ohio communities.

Routes
All routes operate Monday through Saturday and depart from Downtown Wheeling.

OVRTA Division
1 Warwood- to Warwood 
2 McMechen- to McMechen via Benwood 
3 Elm Grove/Highlands- to Highlands Mall via Woodsdale, Edgewood, and Elm Grove 
4 Mt. DeChantal- to Wheeling Medical Park via Woodsdale, Edgewood, and Wheeling Jesuit University 
5 Mozart/Bethlehem- to Bethlehem via Mozart and Mt. Olivet 
6 North Park/Wheeling Heights- to North Park via Wheeling Heights 
7 Wheeling Island- to Wheeling Island

EORTA Division
8 Blaine/Mall- to Ohio Valley Mall via Bridgeport, Brookside, Lansing, and Blaine
9 Shadyside- to Shadyside via Bridgeport and Bellaire
10 Martins Ferry/Yorkville- to Yorkville via Bridgeport and Martins Ferry 
11 Martins Ferry/Rayland- to Rayland via Bridgeport, Martins Ferry, Yorkville, and Tiltonsville

References

External links 
 OVEORTA

Transportation in West Virginia
Transportation in Ohio County, West Virginia
Wheeling, West Virginia
Bus transportation in West Virginia
Transit agencies in West Virginia